The Bolătău (also: Largu) is a left tributary of the river Bistrița in Romania. It flows into Lake Izvorul Muntelui near Poiana Largului.

References

Rivers of Romania
Rivers of Neamț County